Mario Domingo Daniele (born November 19, 1961 in San Justo, Buenos Aires) was an Argentine Justicialist Party Senator representing Tierra del Fuego.

He was elected to the Senate in 2001.  Previously, Daniele was active in local politics in Ushuaia, serving as President of the Department Council from 1997-2003.  He unsuccessfully ran for Governor of Tierra del Fuego in 1995 and served as head of the Justicialist Party from 1995 to 1997.

Daniele left the Senate in 2007.

External links
Senate Profile (Spanish)

1961 births
Living people
People from Buenos Aires Province
Justicialist Party politicians
Argentine people of Italian descent
Members of the Argentine Senate for Tierra del Fuego